Upstate Citizens for Equality (UCE) was a citizens' rights group based in Verona, New York, that opposed Oneida Indian Nation (OIN) land claims, the Turning Stone Resort Casino, the OIN's application to the US Interior Department to place  into federal trust, OIN sovereignty, and what it viewed as flawed federal Indian policy.  The group organized protests at the OIN's gas stations and casino condemning OIN's sovereign status and unique relationship with the US government and New York State.

Legal actions
UCE and some individual members filed several legal actions to further UCE's goals, including several failed challenges to the OIN's land claim.  UCE challenged the validity of the 1993 tribal-state gaming compact between the Oneidas and New York State that Turning Stone Casino & Resort operates under. UCE and some individual members also challenged the OIN's application to have land taken into trust under the Indian Reorganization Act of 1934. Judge Kahn dismissed UCE's complaints, including the failed theory that the IRA is unconstitutional, on the basis of longstanding and settled law on this issue.  UCE appealed the dismissal to the US Second Circuit Court of Appeals, where the decision was affirmed.

Criticism
It has been reported that every Native Nation located in the vicinity of New York State and other tribes represented by the United South and Eastern Tribes (USET) views UCE as an anti-Indian hate group. 
The article was published in Indian Country, which is now owned by the OIN.  Though, the OIN condemned UCE long before purchasing the paper. The OIN had the most contact with this organization.  The OIN were critical of UCE and its members. USET currently, and at the time of the adoption of this resolution was led by a representative of the Oneida Indian Nation of New York elected by the 24 Native Nation representatives.   UCE countered that the OIN lodged accusations of racism in order to stifle the voice of those who oppose its policies. Non-Indians also charged UCE members as being a group of racists. UCE denied such accusations, despite its stated purpose.

In December 2006, UCE President David Vickers made a comment while speaking on a Syracuse, NY radio program that sparked allegations of racism.  Mr. Vickers and WSYR talk show host Jim Reith were discussing the U.S. Supreme Court's refusal to hear an appeal from the New York State Court Appeals in Peterman v Pataki. The following is a snippet of the dialog that transpired during that show:

The National Congress of American Indians, which is made up of elected representatives of the overwhelming majority of Indian tribes, also condemned the UCE as a racist hate group; comparing UCE members to David Duke.

References

External links
website

Aboriginal title in the United States
Native American history of New York (state)
Native American law
Political advocacy groups in the United States